The Lesser Antilles subduction zone is a convergent plate boundary on the seafloor along the eastern margin of the Lesser Antilles Volcanic Arc.  In this subduction zone, oceanic crust of the South American Plate is being subducted under the Caribbean Plate.

References

 Deep structure of an island arc backstop, Lesser Antilles subduction zone, Christeson et al, (2003) Journal of Geophysical Research, V.108, p.2327

Plate tectonics
Subduction zones
Lesser Antilles
Seismic faults of North America